Ognjen Koroman (born 19 September 1978) is a Serbian football manager and former professional player.

As a player, he represented Serbia and Montenegro at the 2006 FIFA World Cup.

Club career
After coming through the youth systems Željezničar and Red Star Belgrade, Koroman played for Radnički Kragujevac, Spartak Subotica, and OFK Beograd in the First League of FR Yugoslavia. He spent a year and a half with each side, before moving abroad in the 2002 winter transfer window.

While playing for Russian Premier League clubs Dynamo Moscow, Krylia Sovetov Samara, and Terek Grozny, Koroman amassed 94 appearances and scored 16 goals in the top flight, being named in the league's best 33 players for the 2002 season.

In January 2006, Koroman moved on loan to English club Portsmouth. He made three appearances for the side in the league, scoring on the final day of the season in a 3–1 loss to Liverpool. In August of the same year, Koroman returned to Portsmouth on a season-long loan. He appeared in three games before leaving the club in the 2007 winter transfer window.

In February 2007, Koroman returned to Serbia and joined his parent club Red Star Belgrade on a seven-month loan deal. He helped the side win the double in the 2006–07 season. In August 2007, Koroman signed a permanent contract with the club.

In July 2009, Koroman moved to Asia and signed with Korean club Incheon United. He thus rejoined his former manager Ilija Petković. In June 2010, Koroman returned to Red Star Belgrade, penning a two-year contract. However, he left the club after just one season.

In June 2011, Koroman returned to Russia and joined his former club Krylia Sovetov Samara, signing a two-and-a-half-year deal. He appeared in nine league games and scored one goal in the first half of the 2011–12 season, before being demoted to the youth squad. In June 2013, Koroman said that he would end his career after his contract with Krylia expires in December of that year.

International career
Koroman was capped 36 times and scored once for Serbia (and its predecessors) from 2002 to 2007. He was a member of the Serbia and Montenegro team in the 2006 FIFA World Cup, making two appearances and receiving two yellow cards in the process.

Managerial career

Žarkovo
Koroman started off his managerial career at Serbian First League club Žarkovo, being appointed manager on 21 May 2019. He started off well, as his team beat Budućnost Dobanovci 4–0 in his first game in charge. However, things changed quickly, as in the next 14 games with Koroman as manager, Žarkovo managed to win only three more games, while from September to October, the team didn't manage to win any game. These results made Koroman resign on 17 October 2019, not even five months after becoming manager.

Smederevo 1924
On 28 December 2019, two months after leaving Žarkovo, Koroman became manager of fellow Serbian First League club Smederevo 1924.

Career statistics

Club

International

Managerial statistics

Honours

Player
Red Star Belgrade
Serbian SuperLiga: 2006–07
Serbian Cup: 2006–07

Individual
Awards
Serbian SuperLiga Team of the Season: 2008–09

Politics 
Koroman is a strong critic of the ruling Serbian Progressive Party (SNS) and called it the "greatest evil". On 17 March 2021, Koroman was elected Vice President of the People's Party (NS) Sports Committee.

References

External links

 
 
 
 
 
 
 

1978 births
Living people
People from Pale, Bosnia and Herzegovina
Serbs of Bosnia and Herzegovina
Bosnia and Herzegovina emigrants to Serbia
Serbia and Montenegro footballers
Serbian footballers
Serbia and Montenegro expatriate footballers
Serbian expatriate footballers
Expatriate footballers in Russia
Expatriate footballers in England
Expatriate footballers in South Korea
Serbia and Montenegro expatriate sportspeople in Russia
Serbian expatriate sportspeople in Russia
Serbian expatriate sportspeople in England
Serbian expatriate sportspeople in South Korea
First League of Serbia and Montenegro players
Serbian SuperLiga players
Russian Premier League players
Premier League players
K League 1 players
FK Radnički 1923 players
FK Spartak Subotica players
OFK Beograd players
FC Dynamo Moscow players
PFC Krylia Sovetov Samara players
FC Akhmat Grozny players
Portsmouth F.C. players
Red Star Belgrade footballers
Incheon United FC players
Serbia and Montenegro international footballers
Serbia international footballers
2006 FIFA World Cup players
Association football midfielders
Serbian football managers
FK Smederevo managers